Eliza Sibbald Alderson (16 August 1818 – 18 March 1889) was an English poet and hymn writer.

Eliza Sibbald Dykes, sister of the famous Rev. J. B. Dykes, was born at Kingston upon Hull, East Riding of Yorkshire, England. In 1850 she was married to Rev. Mr. Alderson, chaplain to the West Riding House of Correction, Wakefield, 1833 to 1876. Though she wrote many hymns, only 12 have been published.  She died in 1889 and was buried at Kirkthorpe.

See also
English women hymnwriters (18th to 19th-century)

 Augusta Amherst Austen
 Sarah Bache
 Charlotte Alington Barnard
 Sarah Doudney
 Charlotte Elliott
 Ada R. Habershon
 Katherine Hankey
 Frances Ridley Havergal
 Maria Grace Saffery
 Anne Steele
 Emily Taylor
 Emily H. Woodmansee

References

 
 
 

1818 births
1889 deaths
Christian hymnwriters
English hymnwriters
19th-century English poets
British women hymnwriters
19th-century English women writers
19th-century English writers
Writers from Kingston upon Hull